Curtis Wolfer (born February 17, 1949), was an American politician who was a member of the Oregon House of Representatives. He was an investment manager.

References

1949 births
Living people
Democratic Party members of the Oregon House of Representatives
People from Silverton, Oregon